A de excommunicato deliberando is a writ which issued out of chancery to release a prisoner from the county jail after the bishop had certified the prisoner's reconciliation with the Church, following his arrest and imprisonment under a writ de excommunicato capiendo.

See also
De Excommunicato Capiendo

References

Ecclesiastical writs
Legal documents with Latin names